Douglas Silva (born 1988) is a Brazilian actor.

Douglas Silva may also refer to:

Douglas Silva (footballer, born 1974), Brazilian football manager and former midfielder
Douglas Silva (footballer, born 1983), Brazilian football defensive midfielder
Douglas Silva (footballer, born 1999), Brazilian football right back
Douglas da Silva (born 1984), Brazilian football defender
Douglas Silva de Andrade (born 1985), Brazilian mixed martial artist